Bigland Tarn is a lake in Cumbria, England, about 3/4 mile southeast of Haverthwaite.

References

Lakes of the Lake District
South Lakeland District